The House of the Dead is a horror video game franchise created by Sega.

The House of the Dead or House of the Dead may also refer to:

Literature 
 The House of the Dead (novel), an 1862 novel by Fyodor Dostoyevsky
 From the House of the Dead, a 1930 opera by Leoš Janáček based on the novel

Film, television and radio 
 The House of the Dead (1932 film), a Soviet Russian film based on the novel of the same name
 The House of the Dead (1978 film), an American anthology horror film also known as Alien Zone
 House of the Dead (film), a 2003 film based on the video game
 "The House of the Dead", an episode of the Torchwood: The Lost Files radio play

Video games 
 The House of the Dead, a series of video games
 The House of the Dead (video game), a 1996 video game and first in the franchise

See also 
 Juárez house of death
 Mortuary house